Matthew Bundy is an American politician currently serving in the Idaho House of Representatives from Idaho's 23rd district. He was elected to the seat after incumbent Republican Christy Zito decided to run for a seat in the Idaho Senate instead of reelection. He defeated Democratic candidate Benjamin Lee in the general election, winning 79.2% to 20.8% in the general election.

Elections

References

Living people
Republican Party members of the Idaho House of Representatives
21st-century American politicians
Year of birth missing (living people)